Phiseline Michel (born 27 July 1997) is a Haitian footballer who plays as a defensive midfielder for Canadian club CS Fabrose and the Haiti women's national team.

International goals
Scores and results list Haiti's goal tally first

References

External links 
 

1997 births
Living people
Women's association football midfielders
Haitian women's footballers
People from Artibonite (department)
Haiti women's international footballers
Haitian expatriate footballers
Haitian expatriate sportspeople in Canada
Expatriate women's soccer players in Canada